Rosemount is an Australian winery based in Hunter Region and South Australia, owned by Treasury Wine Estates. At the turn of the 21st century, Rosemount was the second best selling Australian wine brand in the US.

History

The company was established in 1969 by Bob Oatley and was Australia's largest family owned winery until its March 2001 merger with Southcorp Wines, which in 2005 merged with the Foster's Group.

Rosemount's first commercially released wine was a Chardonnay-Sémillon labeled as Pinot Riesling, reflecting the Hunter Region tradition of then calling Sémillon "Hunter Riesling".

In October 2000, Rosemount announced a partnership with Robert Mondavi Winery to create a joint venture marketing both Californian and Australian wines under a new label collaboration.

See also
South Australian wine

References

External links
 Rosemount Home page

Wineries in South Australia
Foster's Group
Treasury Wine Estates
Australian companies established in 1969
Food and drink companies established in 1969